A computer security policy defines the goals and elements of an organization's computer systems. The definition can be highly formal or informal. Security policies are enforced by organizational policies or security mechanisms. A technical implementation defines  whether a computer system is secure or insecure. These formal policy models can be categorized into the core security principles of Confidentiality, Integrity, and Availability. For example, the Bell-La Padula model is a confidentiality policy model, whereas the Biba model is an integrity policy model.

Formal description 
If a system is regarded as a finite-state automaton with a set of transitions (operations) that change the system's state, then a security policy can be seen as a statement that partitions these states into authorized and unauthorized ones.

Given this simple definition, one can define a secure system as one that starts in an authorized state and will never enter an unauthorized state.

Formal policy models

Confidentiality policy model
 Bell-La Padula model

Integrity policies model
 Biba model
 Clark-Wilson model

Hybrid policy model
 Chinese Wall (Also known as Brewer and Nash model)

Policy languages 
To represent a concrete policy, especially for automated enforcement of it, a language representation is needed. There exist a lot of application-specific languages that are closely coupled with the security mechanisms that enforce the policy in that application.

Compared with this abstract policy languages, e.g., the Domain Type Enforcement-Language, is independent of the concrete mechanism.

See also 
 Anti-virus
 Information Assurance - CIA Triad
 Firewall (computing)
Protection mechanisms
Separation of protection and security
 ITU Global Cybersecurity Agenda

References 
 

 
Clark, D.D. and Wilson, D.R., 1987, April. A comparison of commercial and military computer security policies. In 1987 IEEE Symposium on Security and Privacy (pp. 184-184). IEEE.

Computer security procedures
Computer security models